The Water and Power Development Authority (WAPDA) cricket team was a first-class cricket side in Pakistan that played in the Quaid-e-Azam Trophy, Patron's Trophy, Pentangular Trophy and also competed in limited-overs cricket, from 1975 to 2018.

History
Water and Power Development Authority first competed at first-class level in the 1975–76 season, but they did not become a permanent part of top-level domestic competitions until the 1997–98 Patron's Trophy, when they finished last out of eight, without a win. They became more successful in the twenty-first century, and won several trophies. After their final season in 2018–19 they had played 219 first-class matches, for 88 wins, 51 losses, 79 draws and one tie.

In May 2019, Pakistan's Prime Minister Imran Khan revamped the domestic cricket structure in Pakistan, excluding departmental teams in favour of regional sides, therefore ending the participation of the team. The Pakistan Cricket Board (PCB) was criticised in removing departmental sides, with players voicing their concern to revive the teams.

Honours
Quaid-e-Azam Trophy 
 1986/87 (3rd Place)
 2002/03 (Quarter-Final)
 2016/17 (Winner)
Patron's Trophy 
 1986/87 (Pre-Quarter-Final)
 2006/07 (Quadrangular Stage)

National One-day Championship
 1997/98 (Final Round)
 1998/99 (Final Round)
 1999/2000 (Semi-Final)
 2001/02 (Semi-Final)
 2002/03  (Runner-up)
 2004/05  (Winner)
 2005/06 (Semi-Final)
 2007/08 (Super Eight)
 2010/11 (Semi-Final)

Last squad 

 Players with international caps are listed in bold.

Team management

See also
 List of Water and Power Development Authority cricketers
 Pakistan Cricket Board
 Water and Power Development Authority

References

External links
 Water and Power Development Authority at CricketArchive

Pakistani first-class cricket teams
Cricket